Elections to Bury Metropolitan Borough Council were held on 1 May 2003.  One-third of the council was up for election and the Labour Party kept overall control of the council.

After the election, the composition of the council was
Labour 27
Conservative 17
Liberal Democrat 4

Election result

Ward results

References

2003 English local elections
2003
2000s in Greater Manchester